The Primera División B (First Division B: in English), also known as Primera División B Metropolitana or simply Primera B Metropolitana in order to distinguish it from the Primera División B Nacional, is the metropolitan tournament of the Paraguayan Tercera División. Only teams from the Gran Asunción metropolitan area and Central Department take part in this third division league. Teams from all other parts of Paraguay that are not part of the Gran Asunción area play the Primera División B Nacional tournament in order to get promoted to the Paraguayan Division Intermedia.

It is being played since 1939. Since that year, the number of teams, rules and names for the tournament have changed, but as of now it is called "Primera División C" (and no more "Primera de Ascenso"). For the 2021 season, 17 teams take part.

The champion of this league gains the right to participate in the Paraguayan División Intermedia and the second placed team plays a play-off game against the second placed team of the Primera División B Nacional (country third division tournament), to decide who will play in Paraguay's second division of football. The last one or two teams are relegated to the fourth division (called "Primera División C") for teams from Gran Asunción.

Teams (2022)

Geographical distribution

List of champions

Championships by team 
 Silvio Pettirossi: 7
 Fernando de la Mora: 4
 Tacuary: 4
 Independiente CG: 4
 Sportivo Trinidense: 4
 Deportivo Pinozá: 3
 Cerro Corá: 3
 Atlántida: 3
 Atlético Colegiales de Lambaré: 3
 Oriental: 3
 Rubio Ñu (B): 2
 12 de Octubre (Villa Aurelia): 2
 Olimpia (Itá): 2
 Tembetary: 2
 12 de Octubre SD: 2
 Valois Rivarola: 2
 General Caballero (Zeballos Cué): 2
 Sportivo San Lorenzo: 2
 12 de Octubre Football Club (Itauguá): 2
 Sportivo Ameliano: 2
 Rubio Ñu: 1
 Sport Colombia (B) (Fernando de la Mora): 1
 General Caballero SF: 1
 Club 24 de Septiembre: 1
 Juventud: 1
 Capitan Figari (Lambaré): 1
 3 de Febrero: 1
 Sportivo Iteño (Itá): 1
 Deportivo Recoleta: 1
 Deportivo Humaitá (Mariano Roque Alonso): 1
 8 de Diciembre of Caacupé: 1
 General Caballero CG: 1
 Presidente Hayes: 1
 River Plate: 1
 29 de Setiembre : 1
 Cristóbal Colón (Ñemby): 1
 Martín Ledesma (Capiatá): 1

List of goalscorers

References

3
Third level football leagues of South America

pl:Tercera división paraguaya